The Campeonato Sudamericano de Clubes Campeones de Básquetbol, or Campeonato Sudamericano de Clubes de Básquetbol (South American Basketball Club Championship), was an international men's professional basketball cup competition that took place between South American sports clubs. It was originally organized by the South American Basketball Confederation, and then later by FIBA Americas. It was played annually between the league champions in each country, plus the winner of the previous edition.

History
The South American Championship of Champion Clubs was founded in 1946, and it was the first international tournament in South America. It was played in a round robin format, usually hosted by a single city. 
From 1965 until 1987 the champion teams (and on many occasions the runners-up too) participated in the FIBA Intercontinental Cup represented South America.The competition was the first-tier and most important club competition in South America until 1996 when the FIBA South American League was launched, with a format that looked more of one of a European completion and not a single tournament.The competition was finally discontinued in the year 2008, after the new top-tier panamerican  FIBA Americas League had been recently formed in December 2007 and meant that each South America country's top teams would qualify to the new league and not the FIBA South American League. Subsequently the South American Championship lost its importance and it was abolished.

South American Championship of Champion Clubs levels on the South American pyramid

1st-tier: (1946 – 1992)
2nd-tier: (1993 – 1996, 2001 – 2007)
3rd-tier: (1996 – 2000, 2008)

Names of the top-tier level South American / Latin American competition
 Consubasquet era: (1946–2007)
 Campeonato Sudamericano de Clubes Campeones de Básquetbol (English: South American Basketball Championship of Champion Clubs): (1946–1992)
 Campeonato Panamericano de Clubes de Básquetbol (English: Pan American Basketball Club Championship): (1993–2000)
 Liga Sudamericana de Básquetbol (LSB) (English: South American Basketball League): (2001–2007)
FIBA Americas era: (2007–present)
 FIBA Americas League: (2007 – 2019)

Format
The competition was hosted in one or more cities. In the first round, the eight clubs were divided in two groups of four teams each. The two best placed teams of each group advanced to the semifinals. In the semifinals, the first placed team of a group played against the other group's runner-up. The final was contested by the semifinal winners.

List of champions

Final tournament

Titles by club

Titles by country

Topscorers per tournament 
1946:  Roberto Lovera (Club Atlético Olimpia) 
1953:  Aristides Isusi (Club Olimpia) 140 pts 
1958:  Héctor Costa (Sporting Club Uruguay) 124 pts
1966:  Wlamir Marques (Corinthians) 
1989:  Al Smith (Trotamundos B.B.C.) - Sam Shepherd of Trotamundos was MVP 
1995:  Billy Law (Rio Claro) 
1998:  Charles Byrd (Vasco da Gama) 161 pts
2000:  Victor David Diaz (Trotamundos B.B.C.) 99 pts 
2003:  Jervaughn Scales (Gimnasia) 
2004: Paolo Quinteros (Boca Juniors) 138 pts 
2006:  Maurice Spillers (Boca Juniors) (also MVP) 
2007:  Evandro Fernandes Pinto (Minas Tenis Clube) 113 pts 
2008:  Leandro Garcia Morales (Bigua) 94 pts

Winning rosters

1950s
1958 Sporting Club Uruguay: Héctor Costa (c), Adolfo Lubnicki, Enrique Baliño, José Llera, Jorge Pagani, Zafiro Antúnez, Hugo Vázquez, Luciano Aranzadi, Tydeo Irigoyen, Carlos Peinado, Nelson Chelle, Carlos Roselló, José Otonello.	Coach: Héctor López Reboledo

1960s
1965 Corinthians: José Edvar Simões, Pedro Yves, Bira, Rene, Wlamir Marques, Rosa Branca. Coach: Moacyr Daiuto 
1967 Thomas Bata: Juan Lishnowski, Josè Pleticovic, Luis Lamig, Francisco Valenzuela, Francisco  Guerrero, Juan Encina, Luis Garcìa, Enrique Espinoza, Ivan Torres, Luis Barrera. 
1969 Corinthians: Ortiz,  Ferraz, Bernardo, Felipe, Bira, Rene, Peninha, Amaury Pasos, Wlamir Marques, Renzo, Fernando, Rosa Branca. Coach: Moacyr Daiuto

1970s
1974 Franca: Hélio Rubens Garcia, Fransérgio, Fausto Giannechini, Gilson Trindade, Robertão -Betão, Gustavo Aguirre, Carlão, Carrarinho, Carraro. Coach: Pedroca.
1975 Franca: Hélio Rubens Garcia, Fransérgio, Fausto Giannechini, Gilson Trindade, Robertão - Betão, Gustavo Aguirre, Carlão, Carrarinho, Carraro.Coach: Pedroca.

1980s
1980 Franca: Hélio Rubens Garcia, Fransérgio, Fausto Giannechini, Guerrinha, Robertão - Tom Zé. Coach: Pedroca
1981 FCO: Miguel Cortijo , Bill Terry, Luis Oroño, Javier Maretto, Jorge Martin, Jose Cotic, Luis Gonzalez, George Berry, Hugo Fransisco Belli. Coach: Leon Najnudel 
1982 FCO: Miguel Cortijo , Bill Terry, Luis Oroño, Harthorne Wingo, Luis Chuzo Gonzalez, Alejandro Meschini, Gabriel Darrás, Sebastian Uranga. Coach: Leon Najnudel
1983 Penarol Montevideo: Daniel Wenzel, Hebert Núñez, Álvaro Tito, Juan Andrés Blanc, Gustavo Tito, Joe McColl, Pedro Malet, Alejandro Trias, Oscar Soto, Lincoln Pérez, Bo Jackson y Jimmy Wells. Coach: Victor Hugo Berardi.  
1985 CA Monte Libano: Cadum, Marcel de Souza, Maury de Souza, Pipoca, Israel Andrade, Bob Miservicius, Paraguai Pisérgio, António Valliengo Toninho. Coach: José Edvar Simões
1986 CA Monte Libano: Ricardo Cardoso Cadum, Marcel de Souza, Maury de Souza, Pipoca, Israel Andrade, António Valliengo Toninho, André Ernesto Stoffel, Cadum, Zé Mauro, Antonio Valliengo Toninho. Coach: José Edvar Simões
1987 FCO: Miguel Cortijo , Luis Oroño, Jimmy Gilbert, Horacio López, Luis Chuzo Gonzalez, Gabriel Darrás, Orlando Tourn, Diego Maggi. Coach: Luis Martinez
1988 Trotamundos: Al Smith, Sam Shepherd, Jerry Corcoram, David Simmons, Alfredo Díaz, Randall Rodríguez, Luís Jiménez, Yván Olivares, Calos Dalrrimple, Allison García, Gustavo Borromé, Douglas Barinas, Efraín Ponce Alexander Nelcha, Manuel Jiménez, Ernesto Rivero. Coach: Osiris Duquela
1989 Trotamundos: Al Smith, Sam Shepherd, Carlos Dalrrimple, César Ramos, Randall Rodríguez, Roldman Toro, Rostyn González, Luís Jiménez, Elías Romero, Manuel Jiménez, Allison García, Yván Olivares, Nicolás Castillo, Luis Gómez, Alexander Nelcha, Elsren Jackson. Coach: Pedro “Camagüey” Espinoza

1990s
1990 Franca: Guerrinha, Fernando Minucci, Rocky Smith, Patrick Reynolds, Paulão - Evandro, Janjão. Coach: Hélio Rubens Garcia 
1991 Franca: Guerrinha, Fernando Minucci, Rocky Smith, Morgan Taylor, Paulão - Evandro, Janjão. Coach: Hélio Rubens Garcia 
1992 Bigua : Perdomo, Gustavo Szczygielski, Luis Pierri , Medrick, Nebel, Toto, Luis Eduardo Larrosa, Enrique Cattivelli, Mark Stevenson, Oldham, Enrique Tucuna, Camilo Castro, Coach: Victor Hugo Berardi 
1993 Asociación Deportiva Atenas: Luis Villar, Marcelo Milanesio, Jervis Cole, De la Fuente, Wallace Bryant, Carlos Colla. Coach: Rubén Magnano
1994 Asociación Deportiva Atenas: Luis Villar, Marcelo Milanesio, De la Fuente, Diego Osella, Fabricio Oberto, Bruno Lábaque, Leandro Palladino, Ben Gillery. Coach: Rubén Magnano
1995 Rio Claro: Valtinho da Silva, Scooby Tec, Taddei Cury, Paulao, Antonio Santana, Luiz Felipe Azevedo, Almir, Gibi, Daniel Ricardo Probst, Efigenio, Seu Agostinho, Walter Rosamila, Gustavo 
1996 Independence de General Pico: Miguel Cortijo, Facundo Sucatzky, Jervis Cole, Melvin Johnson, Pelado Sanchez, Sergio Aispurúa, Raul Merlo, Alberto Falasconi, Luis Chuzo Gonzalez, Pablo Cariddi. Coach: Mario Guzman
1998 Vasco da Gama: Charles Byrd, Jose Mingao, Demétrius Conrado Ferraciú, Rogerio Klafke, Janjao , Ricardinho dos Santos, Jose Vargas, Paulinho, Carlao, Dial, Ze Carlos.
1999 Vasco da Gama: Charles Byrd, Helio Rubens Garcia Filho, Jose Mingao, Demétrius Conrado Ferraciú, Janjao, Rogerio Klafke, Ricardinho dos Santos, Jose Vargas. Coach: Flor Meléndez

2000s
2000 Trotamundos: Oscar Torres, Victor David Diaz, Carl Herrera, Sean Colson, Art Long, C.Estaba, A.Garcia, R.Osorio, V.Heredia, P.Barrios 
2002 Delfines de Miranda: Victor David Diaz, Carl Herrera, Ruben Nembhard, Nate Johnston, Ludwing Irazabal, Jose Mora, Alejandro Quiroz, Rafael Guevara, Luis Julio, Pablo Machado, Armando Becker. Coach: Francisco "Paco" Diez
2003 Delfines de Miranda: Carl Herrera, Derrick Brown, Victor David Diaz, Alejandro Quiroz, Angel Caballero, Richard Lugo.
2004 Boca Juniors: Rotta Juan Pablo, Leonardo Peralta, Fernando Malara, Carlos Matías Sanders, Lucas Ortiz, Juan Sartorelli, Martin Leiva, Sebastian Festa, Paolo Quinteros, Raheim Brown, Alejandro Burgos  
2005 Boca Juniors: Carlos Matías Sanders, Sherell Ford Lucas Ortiz, Martin Leiva, Paolo Quinteros, Diego Alba, Fernando Malara, Luis Cequeira, Carlos Strong, Fernando Funes, Leonardo Peralta. Coach: Carlos Duro.
2006 Boca Juniors: Julian Aprea, Raymundo Legaria, Lucas Ortiz, Martin Miner, Matias Fioretti, Luis Cequeira, Leonardo Gutierrez, Martin Leiva, Gustavo Orona, Lazaro Borrell, Rodrigo Sanchez, Maurice Spillers. Coach: Eduardo Cadillac
2007 Minas Tenis Clube: Soro, Maozao, Facundo Sucatzky, Wanderson Trigueiro, Evandro Fernandes Pinto, Andre, Luiz Felipe, Marcio, Romario Souza, Mauro, Guilherme, Sean Knitter. Coach: Flavio Davis Furtado
2008 Biguá: Leandro Garcia Morales, Kevin Young, Duke Freeman-McKarney, Santiago Vidal, Nathan Guillermo, Martín Osimani, Juan Cambon, Joaquin Osimani, Gonzalo Meira, Gonzalo Carvidon, Juan Jose Rovira, Matthias Calfani. Coach: Néstor Garcia

See also
 FIBA Americas League
 Pan American Championship
 FIBA South American League

References

Sources
FIBA Archive 95-08
1990 edition
1983 edition
1958 edition 
History
Basketball Uruguano
Trotamundos: history
Bigua history

External links
South American Championship of Champion Clubs

Sudamericano de Clubes
Recurring sporting events established in 1946
Basketball competitions in South America
Defunct basketball leagues